Torchwood: Children of Earth is a soundtrack album which was released on 7 July 2009, containing incidental music composed by Ben Foster used in the third series ("Children of Earth") of the British science fiction television programme Torchwood, which aired July 2009.
Unlike with the Torchwood: Original Television Soundtrack the album was released simultaneously for download with the official release of 7 July 2009.

Track listing

References

Soundtrack Children
Television soundtracks
2009 soundtrack albums
Silva Screen Records soundtracks